Michael Lally (1 July 1714 – 1773) was Irish soldier.

Lally was a member of the senior line of the Ó Maolalaidh of Máenmaige but who had been resident at Tullaghnadaly, Tuam, since the 15th century. 

He was a descendant of Seán Ó Maolalaidh (fl. 1419–1480), Chief of the Name, and was a cousin to Thomas Arthur, comte de Lally, baron de Tollendal (1702–1766). His parents were Michael Lally and Helen O'Carroll, he been born at Ballyveck, Tuam. 

On emigrating to France, Lally joined Dillon's regiment. In 1745, after ten years service, he was made captain in the regiment named after his uncle, Gerard Lally. He fought at the Battle of Fontenoy, after which he was promoted to colonel, and later again to that of brigadier-general. He was the constant companion of Count Lally during the many vicissitudes of a strenuous campaign in India. He returned in 1762 and died at Rouen in 1773.

References

 Biographical Dictionary of Irishmen in France, Richard Hayes, Dublin, 1949

18th-century Irish people
People from County Galway
1714 births
1773 deaths
Irish soldiers in the French Army
Irish expatriates in France